What the Industrial Revolution Did for Us is a BBC documentary series produced in conjunction with the Open University that examines the impact of the Industrial Revolution on modern society. It was originally broadcast on BBC Two from 7 October to 11 November 2003.

Reception

Ratings
 Episode one this episode produced the lowest ratings of the series.(2003-10-07): 2.6 million viewers.
 Episode four (2003-10-28): 2.4 million viewers.

Episodes

Episode one: Material World

Cruickshank travels around Britain to introduce the idea and inventions of the Industrial Revolution that created the modern material world.

Iron masters such as Abraham Darby I and John Iron Mad Wilkinson laid the foundations of modern metallic constructions.
The atmospheric engine built by Thomas Newcomen to pump water from the mines powered the Industrial Revolution.
Plantations conceived by Joseph Banks in New Zealand and Australia with James Cook sowed the seeds of the global economy.
Mechanisation emerged in the cotton industry from John Kay's flying shuttle and James Hargreaves’ spinning jenny.
China clay discovered by William Cookworthy allowed British potters to create the first British porcelain.
Mass production emerged from all these innovations bringing the good life of the elite to the masses.

Episode two: Working Wonders

Cruickshank travels around Britain to introduce the idea and inventions of the Industrial Revolution that created the features of modern working life.

Innovations in agriculture allowed farmers to produce enough food to allow the expanding population to flourish.
Civil engineering emerged from the experiments in waterwheel efficiencies undertaken by John Smeeton.
The steam engine was developed from the Newcombe engine by James Watt and Matthew Boulton in the first international corporation.
The letter copying press developed by Watt to deal with the mass of paper work at this business was the original photocopier.
The division of labour discussed by Adam Smith led to the production line developed by Bolton in early management consultancy.
The Jacquard loom of Joseph Marie Jacquard programmed with punch cards was the forerunner of the modern computer.

Episode three: On the Move

Cruickshank travels around Britain to introduce the idea and inventions of the Industrial Revolution that created the features of modern transportation.

The elliptical spring of Obadiah Eliott revolutionised carriage design with the first suspension.
A national road network constructed by John Loudon McAdam and Thomas Telford opened up the country to trade and travel.
The suspension bridge constructed by Telford across the Menai Strait was the most ambitious in the world.
The wind powered charvolant of George Pocock opened people's eyes to forms of power other than the horse.
The high-pressure steam engine of Richard Trevithick powered the first steam carriage and railway locomotive.
The Rocket of George & Robert Stephenson was the first self-propelled machine to outpace a galloping horse.
The first aeroplane design and manned flight came out of George Cayley's study of aerodynamics.

Episode four: Modern Medicine

Cruickshank travels around Britain to introduce the idea and inventions of the Industrial Revolution that created the features of modern medicine.

Modern medicine emerged from William Withering's scientific study of traditional folk remedies.
The ventilator of Stephen Hales helped to reduce airborne diseases with the first air-conditioning.
Dephlogisticated air discovered by Joseph Priestley in experiments with a giant lens was later renamed Oxygen.
Vaccinations were developed by Edward Jenner from his observation of milkmaids to fight Smallpox.
The stethoscope of René Laennec allowed Charles Thackerer to examine the effects of industry on workers' health.
The Anatomy Act allowed doctors like William Hunter make huge advancements in understanding the human body.

Episode five: War Machine

Cruickshank travels around Britain to introduce the idea and inventions of the Industrial Revolution that created the features of modern warfare.

The riflemen were the first to wear green as camouflage and taught to use their initiative.
Rifling was used on the Baker rifle by Ezekiel Baker] to increase distance and accuracy.
The mechanised production line of Marc Brunel and Henry Maudslay revolutionised industry.
The first mass-produced precision-made object with interchangeable-parts was the Enfield rifle.
The torpedo delivered by the Turtle of David Bushnell was the beginning of submarine warfare.
The boring machine of John Iron Mad Wilkinson revolutionised the casting of cannons and the steam engine.
Wrought-iron was used for the iron-hulled HMS Warrior and its rifled Armstrong Guns.

Episode six: City Living

Cruickshank travels around Britain to introduce the idea and inventions of the Industrial Revolution that created the features of modern city life.

Standardised house construction with integrated services were created by architects of the Westend housing boom like Thomas Cubitt.
High-pressure water from cast-iron pipes specified in the 1817 Metropolitan Paving Act led to the modern bathroom.
Consumer choice emerged through the flat fascias and plate glass windows of the arcades and parades of modern shop fronts.
Marketing emerged from the catalogues, hoardings and door-to-door salesmen of Josiah Wedgwood and Thomas Bentley.
The steam press of Friedrich Koenig and Andreas Friedrich Bauer allowed The Times to dramatically increase circulation.
Interior design emerged from the new brightly coloured dyes such as the chrome yellow of Louis Vauquelin.

Companion book

External links
BBC History website
Open University website

References

2003 British television series debuts
2003 British television series endings
2000s British documentary television series
2000s British television miniseries
English-language television shows
BBC television documentaries about history during the 18th and 19th centuries
Industrial history of the United Kingdom
Television series about the history of the United Kingdom
Works about the history of industries
Works about the Industrial Revolution